Larry Emery is a retired running back who played in the National Football League. He was drafted in the twelfth round of the 1987 NFL Draft by the Atlanta Falcons and played that season with the team.

References

Sportspeople from Macon, Georgia
Atlanta Falcons players
American football running backs
Wisconsin Badgers football players
1964 births
Living people